C. B. Lee is a Chinese-Vietnamese-American author based out of Los Angeles, California.  They are the author of young adult fiction, best known for their Sidekick Squad series, which follows a quartet of teenagers in a near future world of superheroes and supervillains.

Profile
Lee's parents are immigrants from Vietnam and China. Lee is openly bisexual and also open about their struggles with mental illness. They have been featured in Teen Vogue, Hypable, and Wired Magazine for their novels. Lee is represented by Thao Le of the Sandra Dijkstra Literary Agency.

Selected works 
Their debut young adult novel, Seven Tears at High Tide, about a boy who gets rescued and falls for a selkie, was published by Duet Books in 2015. It won the 2016 Rainbow Award for Bisexual Fantasy & Fantasy Romance in 2016 and was a finalist for the 2016 Bisexual Book Award in the category Young Adult and Speculative Fiction.

The first book in the Sidekick Squad series, Not Your Sidekick, was published by Duet Books in 2016. It tells the story of Jess, a bisexual teen without superpowers living in a world where superpowers are normal, who has to compete with her town's infamous supervillain for her dream internship and deal with her crush on her friend Abby. Not Your Sidekick was a finalist for the 2017 Lambda Literary Award in the category LGBTQ Children's/Young Adult and a finalist for the 2017 Bisexual Book Award in Speculative Fiction. The second book, Not Your Villain, following the protagonists from the first novel who have now joined a resistance movement, was published by Duet Books in 2017. A third book, Not Your Backup, was published in 2019. Lee cites the X-men and wanting to write a story incorporating identity and alienation as inspiration for writing the series.

Lee also contributed a short story to Saundra Mitchell's Out Now: Queer We Go Again!, published by Inkyard Press in 2020.

Selected bibliography

Young Adult series

Sidekick Squad
Not Your Sidekick (Duet Books, 2016)
Not Your Villain (Duet Books, 2017)
Not Your Backup (Duet Books, 2019)
 Not Your Hero (2022, not released yet)

Stand-alone young adult novels
 Seven Tears at High Tide (Duet Books, 2015)
 A Clash of Steel: A Treasure Island Remix (Macmillan, 2021)

Awards

Won
 Rainbow Award for Bisexual Fantasy & Fantasy Romance for Seven Tears at High Tide (Duet Books, 2015)

Nominated
Bisexual Book Award in Young Adult and Speculative Fiction for Seven Tears at High Tide (Duet Books, 2015)
Lambda Literary Award in the category LGBTQ Children's/Young Adult for Not Your Sidekick (Duet Books, 2016)
 Bisexual Book Award Finalist in Speculative Fiction for Not Your Sidekick (Duet Books, 2016)
Lambda Literary Award in the category LGBTQ Children's/Young Adult for Not Your Sidekick (Duet Books, 2017)

References 

Living people
Women writers of young adult literature
21st-century American women writers
21st-century American novelists
American women novelists
Year of birth missing (living people)
21st-century LGBT people
American bisexual writers